Xylotype is a genus of moths of the family Noctuidae.

Species
 Xylotype arcadia Barnes & Benjamin, 1922
 Xylotype capax (Grote, 1868)

References
Natural History Museum Lepidoptera genus database
Xylotype at funet

Cuculliinae